The International Qajar Studies Association (IQSA) is an association specialised in the study of the Qajar Era and the Qajar dynasty. The association organises conferences, study days, lectures, cultural events and exhibitions, publishes books, a Journal (Qajar Studies) and a regular newsletter, runs a Studies and Documentation Centre and brings together scholars from across the globe. The association also assisted in establishing the Harvard University project Women's World in Qajar Iran: A digital Archive and Website  and co-funded the foundation of the Centre for the Study of the International Relations of the Middle East and North Africa (Cirmena) of the University of Cambridge.

Objective writing on the history of the Qajars
In the years leading up to the year 2000 several individuals were actively but separately looking for a vehicle for the study of the Qajar Era. Among these persons, were, in Europe: Leo Barjesteh, Ali Mirza Qajar, Hans Timmermans, Willem Vogelsang, Gillian Vogelsang-Eastwood and Corien Vuurman, in the United States: Manoutchehr Eskandari-Qajar, Farhad Sepahbody and Majid Tehranian, and in Iran: Bahman Bayani, Mansoureh Ettehadieh and Bahman Farman Farmaian. The study and writing on the history of the era had seen its difficulties since the fall of the Qajar dynasty. In Iran in the 1990s this situation seemed to change and the time to start an association to facilitate a more objective study of the period seemed opportune.

Foundation and activities
In 2000 the International Qajar Studies Association was founded and registered in Santa Barbara in the United States. May 2000 saw the first meeting of IQSA at the premises of the publishing house (Nashr-e Tarikh-e Iran) of Dr. Mansoureh Ettehadieh in Tehran.
An Advisory Board was formed with eminent scholars in the field. The first IQSA conference was held on May 17–19, 2001. This inaugural conference ‘Reading early photographs: visual sources for the interpretation of Iranian Qajar history’ took place at Leiden University. Since then IQSA held conferences at a large variety of universities and institutes, both in Europe: Leiden University (2002), Cantonal Hospital and Mossadeq Institute, Geneva (2003), Corpus Christi College, Cambridge (2005), CNRS, Université Paris III (2006), with the Fondation Napoléon at the Bibliothèque Paul Marmottan (2007), the International Institute of Social History, Amsterdam, and Leiden University (2008), the Austrian Academy of Sciences, Vienna (2009), St Antony's College, Oxford and St Anne's College, Oxford(2010), the International Institute of Social History, Amsterdam, and the National Museum of Antiquities, Leiden (2011), University of St Andrews, Scotland (2011), the HAN University of Applied Sciences and Radboud University, Nijmegen (2013), the University of Bamberg (2014), the Museum the Ursuline Convent – International Museum for Family History, Eijsden-Margraten (2015) and again in the Austrian Academy of Sciences, Vienna (2016), and in the United States Santa Barbara City College (2004) and Boston University (2012).
At the 2015 conference at The Ursuline Convent the IQSA board decided to continue – henceforth – with annual Qajar Studies Days (lectures and workshops) on a fixed location (The Ursuline Convent) and with biyearly conferences.

Since 2000 IQSA published five books (Qajar Era Dress, Qajar Era Health, the Montabone Album, Nineteenth-century Persia in the Photographs of Abert Hotz and Putting the Shah in the Landscape) and sixteen journals (Qajar Studies).

References

External links
 http://www.iqsa.ursulinenconvent.com
 http://worldcat.org/identities/lccn-nr2003029071/
 http://www.iranicaonline.org/articles/historiography-viii

Qajar Iran
Iranian studies